Radu Paliciuc (born September 13, 1988) is a Romanian basketball player for CSU Sibiu and the Romanian national team.

He participated at the EuroBasket 2017.

References

1988 births
Living people
CSU Sibiu players
Romanian men's basketball players
Small forwards
Sportspeople from Brașov
European Games competitors for Romania
Basketball players at the 2019 European Games